Quik may refer to:

 DJ Quik (born 1970), American MC and record producer
 Nesquik (formerly known as Nestlé Quik in some countries), a family of milk beverage products made by the Nestlé corporation
 Pegasus Quik, a British flying wing ultralight trike
 quik (boot loader), a boot loader designed to start Linux on Apple Macintosh PowerPC systems
 Quik Internet (NZ) Ltd, a former New Zealand based ISP
 Serge Quik, Belgian drag queen

See also 
 QUIC, network protocol
 Quick (disambiguation)